Caribbean Travel & Life was dedicated to the Caribbean region and was named the official consumer publication of the Caribbean Tourism Organization and the Caribbean Hotel Association.

The magazine wove together the geographical and cultural threads that make each of the region's destinations distinctive, and presented a range of essential service information on the various aspects of travel (resorts, dining and activities). Caribbean Travel & Life was published by Bonnier Corporation; predecessor World Publications bought Caribbean Travel & Life in 1997. Both companies published the magazine from Winter Park, Florida. The founding company is Caribbean Travel and Life, Inc. which published the magazine in Alexandria, Virginia, and then, in Silver Spring, Maryland, before moved it to Winter Park, Florida.

On November 29, 2012, Bonnier announced that it would close Caribbean Travel & Life, with the January/February edition as its final issue in 2013. Bonnier would fold the magazine and its content to its sister, Islands.

References

External links 
 Caribbean Travel & Life

1986 establishments in Florida
2013 disestablishments in Florida
Bonnier Group
Defunct magazines published in the United States
Eight times annually magazines published in the United States
Lifestyle magazines published in the United States
Local interest magazines published in the United States
Magazines established in 1986
Magazines disestablished in 2013
Magazines published in Florida
Magazines published in Maryland
Magazines published in Virginia
Tourism magazines